The following is a list of senators of Ain, people who have represented the department of Ain in the Senate of France.

Third Republic

Senators from the Ain during the French Third Republic were:

Fourth Republic

Senators from the Ain during the French Fourth Republic were:

Fifth Republic 
Senators from the Ain during the French Fifth Republic have been:

Senators of the Ain (1959-1962 mandate)

Senators of the Ain (1962-1971 mandate)

Senators of the Ain (1971-1980 mandate)

Senators of the Ain (1980-1989 mandate)

Senators of the Ain (1989-1998 mandate)

Senators of the Ain (1998-2008 mandate)

Senators of the Ain (2008-2014 mandate)

Senators of the Ain (2014-2020 mandate)

Senators of the Ain (2020-2026 mandate)

References

Sources

 
Lists of members of the Senate (France) by department